The 1976 Stevenage Borough Council election took place on 6 May 1976. This was on the same day as other local elections. The entire council was up for election and the Labour Party retained control of the council.

Overall results

|-bgcolor=#F6F6F6
| colspan=2 style="text-align: right; margin-right: 1em" | Total
| style="text-align: right;" | 34
| colspan=5 |
| style="text-align: right;" | 15,458
| style="text-align: right;" | 
|-
|colspan="11" bgcolor=""|
|-
| style="background:"|
| colspan="10"| Labour hold

Ward results

Bedwell (5 seats)

Broadwater (5 seats)

Chells (5 seats)

Old Stevenage (5 seats)

Pin Green (8 seats)

Shephall (6 seats)

References

1976
1976 English local elections
1970s in Hertfordshire